Sarov is a village and municipality in the Goranboy Rayon of Azerbaijan. It has a population of 854.

Notable natives 

 Anvar Farajov — National Hero of Azerbaijan.

References

Populated places in Goranboy District